Oaks Cloister, is the name of the former residence of architect, Joseph Miller Huston. Constructed in 1900, the mansion is located at 5829 Wissahickon Ave,, Philadelphia, Pennsylvania, 19141, in the Germantown section of Philadelphia, Pennsylvania, and was the home and studio of Philadelphia-born Joseph Huston (1866-1940), architect of the Pennsylvania Capitol. The Tudor style home incorporates architectural elements and work by many capital artists. Oaks Cloister was fully restored to its original glory in 2012, and was listed on the National Register of Historic Places in 2019.

History

Huston Family (1900–1955) 

Joseph Miller Huston was born in Philadelphia, Pennsylvania, in 1866. He trained and worked as an architect during college and graduated from Princeton University in 1892. Huston founded his own firm in 1895, just a few short years after starting his career with famous Philadelphia architect, Frank Furness. Huston designed Oaks Cloister creating an eclectic blend of English Tudor and Swiss Chalet influences.

Huston designed portions of Oaks Cloister during the construction of his best known work, the Pennsylvania State Capitol. Oaks Cloister is an eclectic blend of Tudor and Craftsman styles, with the Beaux-Arts flair of the capital project mixed-in. Oaks Cloister became a test lab and an intimate sampler of the capital's architectural features. This is evident with Huston's use of scaled design mock-ups and identical detailing throughout the home. Huston lived at Oaks Cloister until his death in 1940.

Post Huston Family (1955–2002) 
Oaks Cloister remained in the Huston family until 1955 when it was bought by Reverend Wilbur and Mrs. Loice Gouker. The Goukers worked tirelessly and lovingly to preserve the rich history of Oaks Cloister. A short video was created showcasing the home during the Goukers' ownership. The video was produced by the Pennsylvania Capital Preservation Committee and called, "Oaks Cloister—The Home of Capitol Architect Joseph Huston". After the Goukers sold the home c.1994, the property fell into disrepair and eventually was left abandoned.

Restoration (2002–2012) 
After years of dereliction, this esteemed estate appeared to be doomed. In 2002, Dr. Russell Harris and Mr. John Casavecchia acquired the property, saving it from impending demolition. The rebirth of this relic took more than a decade of painstaking restoration efforts. Bringing the mansion back to its original glory proved to be a monumental task. This dedicated labor of love did not come without its fair share of rewards, however. Many hidden treasures were unearthed during construction and brought back to life from the dilapidated ruins.

Every space in the century old, 20-room mansion has been restored to its original beauty. Some of the more distinguished refurbished areas include:    
 The Ballroom- Possibly the most dramatic restoration project was the transformation of the home's ballroom. When the project began, the ceilings and carved panels above the fireplace were covered in thick, dark soot and dirt. After some research, it was discovered that Huston had imported the hand-carved stone fireplace from Caen, France. It is believed that the piece is a replica of a royal fireplace, currently located in the Cluny Museum in Paris. The legend is that the original fireplace, named the "Chimnee de Couleur" had been custom made for King Francis I, in the 15th century. It was originally located in Rouen, France, but, two centuries later, when seeing it for the first time, Emperor Napoleon Bonaparte was so taken by the work of art he had it moved to capital city of Paris. Other features of the ballroom include: 
 a gilded coffered ceiling, which took 25,000 sheets of gold leaf to restore, 
 a gold mosaic tile wall-niche/grotto, housing a sculpture named, "Venus in the Waves" by George Grey Barnard. Huston had also commissioned Bernard to create sculptures at the Pennsylvania Capitol.
 The Sitting Room- A mask, cast from the sculpture, "Boar's Hunt" is mounted above the fireplace. The original carved wooden panel, by famous sculptor, Alexander Stirling Calder, is located at Mercersburg Academy.
 Main Staircase- At the entrance foyer
 Master Bedroom- On the second floor.
 Dining Room- On the first floor.
 Music Room- On the first floor.
 Rathskeller- This underground beer hall was an addition to the original home, constructed after 1901.

Events venue 
The restored facility, with its convenient location, large gathering spaces, and interesting past has served as a popular meeting venue for various organizations and special events.

Historical Recognition

State Historical marker (2005) 
A Pennsylvania state historic marker was placed on the property on October 20, 2005. It reads: "Joseph Huston (1866-1940) Oaks Cloister, built in 1900, was the home and studio of Philadelphia born Huston, architect of the PA Capitol. His Tudor home incorporates architectural elements and work by many capital artists. He began his career at Furness and Evans, starting his firm in 1895."[2]

National Register of Historic Places (2019) 
Oaks Cloister was placed on the National Register of Historic Places on April 22, 2019.

References 

Residential buildings in Pennsylvania
Houses in Philadelphia
Germantown, Philadelphia
National Register of Historic Places in Philadelphia